Luzius Philipp (born 28 April 1965) is a Swiss sprint canoeist who competed in the late 1980s. At the 1988 Summer Olympics in Seoul, he advanced to the semifinals of the K-1 500 m event, but did not start.

References
Sports-Reference.com profile

1965 births
Canoeists at the 1988 Summer Olympics
Living people
Olympic canoeists of Switzerland
Swiss male canoeists
Place of birth missing (living people)